Nine Grahas Temples (Navagraham temples) in Tamil Nadu is a set of nine Hindu temples, each dedicated to one of the nine planetary deities, the Navagraham in various places around the South Indian own of Kumbakonam in Tamil Nadu, India. The presiding deity in most of the temples is Shiva, with a shrine dedicated to the planetary deity. Leaving Tirunallar Saniswaran Temple which is located in Karaikkal, all the other temples are located in Tamil Nadu.

The present masonry structure for most of the temples were built during the reign of Medieval Cholas between the 7th and 11th centuries with later additions from the Vijayanagar period. Constructed in the Dravidian style of architecture, most of the temples have a five-tiered rajagopuram, the gateway tower and a granite wall enclosing all the shrines of the temple.

The temples are a part of the popular Navagraham pilgrimage in Tamil Nadu. It is believed that the planetary deities were cursed by Brahma to dwell in Vellurukku Vanam, the white wild flower jungle and were blessed by Shiva to make it their abode to devotees. The temples have six daily rituals at various times from 5:30 a.m. to 9 p.m., and two yearly festivals on its calendar. The temples are maintained and administered by the Hindu Religious and Charitable Endowments Department of the Government of Tamil Nadu.

Legend
As per Hindu legend, Sage Kalava was suffering from serious ailments along with leprosy. He prayed to the Navagrahas, the nine planet deities. The planets were pleased by his devotion and offered cure to the sage. Brahma, the Hindu god of creation, was angered as he felt that the planets have no powers to provide boons to humans. He cursed the nine planets to suffer from leprosy and were sent down to earth in Vellurukku Vanam, the white wild flower jungle - the modern time Suryanar Kovil. The planets prayed to Shiva to relieve them off the curse. Shiva appeared to them and said that the place belonged to them and they would have to grace the devotees worshipping them from the place. This is the only temple where there are separate shrines for each of the planet deities.

The temples
Suryanar Kovil is located to the East of Kumbakonam,  from Aduthurai and the Kumbakonam - Mayiladuthurai road. The temple has direct connectivity from lower Anicut and Thiruppanandal. Out of the nine temples, six are located on the northern bank of river Kaveri, while the remaining three in the southern bank.
 Padal petra stalam - where the three of the most revered Nayanars (Saivite Saints), Appar, Sundarar and Tirugnana Sambandar have glorified the temples in Tevaram during the 7th-8th centuries.

History
The Suryanar Kovil was built during the reign of Kulottunga Choladeva (AD 1060-1118) and was called Kulottungachola-Marttandalaya. The current granite shrine is believed to have been built by the Vijayanagara Empire. In modern times, all the temples are maintained and administered by the Hindu Religious and Charitable Endowments Department of the Government of Tamil Nadu. The Suryanar temple is mentioned in the songs of Muthuswami Dikshitar, who has composed a song starting with "Suryamurthe" in Saurashatra ragam.

The temple of Thingalur is associated with the legend of Appar bringing back the life of the son of Appoothi Adigal. The idol of moon is made of black granite and clad in pure white.

Vaitheeswaran Koil has five inscriptions mainly belonging to the period of Kulothunga Chola I (1070-1120 CE).  The inscription on the steps of Subramanya shrine records the shutter of the sluice at Sattainathapuram measures 35 inches in length and 8 inches in breadth. The one on the right of the temple tank indicates the tank, Nachiyar shrine, and its hall were completely renovated when Kanderayar was governing the Sigali Simai, and during the management of the temple by Muthukumaraswami Tambiran, a disciple of Sivagnanadesikar-Sambandar of the Dharmapuram Adheenam.  On the wall of the second precinct, the inscriptions state that the courtyard of Thayalnayagi shrine, the sacred steps and Tattisuri hall were built during Tamil year 4868 corresponding to 1689 CE.  On the floor near accountant's seat registers a deed granted by Sankarabaragiri Rengopanditar by Ambalavanatambiran, an agent of the temple.  The Easter gateway inscription indicates the gift of taxes from Manipallam in Tiruvalipparu.

Architecture
There is no specific architecture pattern that uniquely identifies these temples. But all of the temples have a rectangular plan with compound walls, pierced by a tiered raja gopuram (entrance tower). Leaving the Suryanar Kovil, the central shrine is usually that of Shiva in the form of lingam and the shrine of the planetary deity is located in the precinct around the main shrine. All the other eight shrines of the Navagrahas are arranged facing the shrine of Suryanar.

Worship and festivals
The temple priests perform the pooja (rituals) during festivals and on a daily basis. Like other Shiva temples of Tamil Nadu, the priests belong to the Shaivaite community, a Brahmin sub-caste. The temple rituals are performed six times a day; Ushathkalam at 5:30 a.m., Kalasanthi at 8:00 a.m., Uchikalam at 10:00 a.m., Sayarakshai at 6:00 p.m., Irandamkalam at 8:00 p.m. and Ardha Jamam at 10:00 p.m. Each ritual comprises four steps: abhisheka (sacred bath), alangaram (decoration), neivethanam (food offering) and deepa aradanai (waving of lamps) for Suryanar, Ushadevi and Chayadevi. The worship is held amidst music with nagaswaram (pipe instrument) and tavil (percussion instrument), religious instructions in the Vedas  read by priests and prostration by worshippers in front of the temple mast.

The temples are a part of the popular Navagraha pilgrimage in Tamil Nadu. The planets are believed to influence the horoscope computed based on time of one's birth and subsequently influence the course of life. Each of the planets are believed to move from a star to another during a predefined period and thus sway over an individual's fortunes. The Navagrahas, as per Hindu customs, are believed to provide both good and bad effects for any individual and the bad effects are mitigated by prayers. As in other Navagraha temples, the common worship practises of the devotees include offering of cloth, grains, flowers and jewels specific to the planet deity. Lighting a set of lamps is also commonly followed in the temple.

References

External links 
 Navagraham temples in Tamil Nadu (Google Maps link)
 Navagraha temples in Tamil Nadu (Kumbakonam)

 
Hindu temples in Thanjavur district
Navagraha